The 1996 CAF African Cup Winners' Cup Final was contested in two-legged home-and-away format between AC Sodigraf from Zaire and Al Mokawloon Al Arab from Egypt, The first leg was hosted by AC Sodigraf at Stade des Martyrs in Kinshasa on 24 November 1996, while the second leg was hosted by Al Mokawloon Al Arab at Cairo International Stadium in Cairo on 8 December 1996.

Al Mokawloon Al Arab won 4–0 on aggregate, earned the right to participate in the 1997 CAF Super Cup against the other Egyptian team Zamalek; the winner of the 1996 African Cup of Champions Clubs.

Match Details

First leg

Second leg

References

African Cup Winners' Cup finals
1
African Cup Winners' Cup
International club association football competitions hosted by the Democratic Republic of the Congo